Dr. Andreas Sperl is the CEO of Elbe Flugzeugwerke and was a chief financial officer (CFO) of the European aircraft manufacturer Airbus S.A.S.  He was appointed CFO of Airbus in June 2000 and is responsible for finance, controlling, accounting, as well as internal audits and risk management.  He is a member of the Airbus Executive Committee.

Professional history
Mr. Sperl began his professional career as a scientific assistant at the University of Münster and joined Daimler Benz AG in 1979 as a specialist in the Participations department. He was appointed assistant to the President and Chief Executive Officer in 1982, and in 1986 became director of group planning.

Between 1989 and 1991, Mr. Sperl was Chairman of the management board of Otomarsan, which later became Mercedes-Benz Türk, and from 1991 to 1995 he was General Director of Mercedes-Benz Mexico.

From 1995 until he was appointed Chief Financial Officer of Airbus, Mr. Sperl held the position of Executive Vice President of DaimlerChrysler Aerospace in Munich, responsible for mergers and acquisitions.

Personal life
Dr. Sperl was born in 1947 in Diepholz in Germany.  Sperl holds a degree in Business Management from the University of Münster as well as a PhD, which he obtained in 1976 from the same university.  Married with two children, Mr. Sperl enjoys playing golf and listening to classical music in his free time.

References

1947 births
German chief executives
Living people
Airbus people
Chief financial officers